This is a list of British divisions formed during the Victorian era. During this period, divisions were raised on an ad hoc basis for a particular conflict. Not all of them are seen as being connected to the divisions raised by the British Army in the 20th Century. For example, Everard Wyrall, the official historian of the 2nd Division during the First World War, described the division's lineage as only including the Crimean and the Second Boer War.

Eighth Xhosa War

Crimean War

Second Opium War

This force was raised from the Presidency armies and British forces based in India.

Second Anglo-Afghan War

This force was raised from the Presidency armies and British forces based in India.

Anglo-Zulu War

Anglo-Egyptian War

Second Boer War

Footnotes

Citations

References

 
 
 
 
 

formations, Victorian
Victorian